White Bear is an unincorporated community in the Rural Municipality of Lacadena No. 228, Saskatchewan, Canada. Listed as a designated place by Statistics Canada, the hamlet had a population of 15 in the Canada 2006 Census.

Demographics 

History 
The community's name comes from the sighting of a probable but now extirpated white prairie grizzly bear by an Assiniboine warrior on the shores of a neighbouring lake during the Palliser Expedition of the 1850s.

During the 1930s, White Bear was a bustling community of approximately 250 residents with two grocery stores, a school, four grain elevators and three garages servicing an area of 200 families, but has since dwindled to a population of 15 in 2006.  Part of the decline is attributed to federal policy Canadian National Railway rail line in that area of Saskatchewan. The region rarely suffered poor crops, except during the droughts of the Great Depression and 1988. It is connected to the rest of the province through Highway 342, a now-decrepit road featuring signs with Imperial units in portions. Farmers from the area played prominently in the socialism that later defined Saskatchewan and then Canada through the introduction of Medicare and state-ran insurance.  The White Bear Hotel remains the only business in operation, noted for its hot wings and hospitality.

See also 
 List of communities in Saskatchewan

References 

Designated places in Saskatchewan
Lacadena No. 228, Saskatchewan
Populated places established in 1910
Unincorporated communities in Saskatchewan